

Acts of the Northern Ireland Assembly

|-
| {{|Health (Miscellaneous Provisions) Act (Northern Ireland) 2008|ania|2|25-02-2008|maintained=y|archived=n|An Act to amend the Health and Personal Social Services (Northern Ireland) Order 1972 in relation to the provision of health care; and for connected purposes.}}
|-
| {{|Budget Act (Northern Ireland) 2008|ania|3|12-03-2008|maintained=y|archived=n|An Act to authorise the issue out of the Consolidated Fund of certain sums for the service of the years ending 31st March 2008 and 2009; to appropriate those sums for specified purposes; to authorise the Department of Finance and Personnel to borrow on the credit of the appropriated sums; to authorise the use for the public service of certain resources for the years ending 31st March 2008 and 2009; and to revise the limits on the use of certain accruing resources in the year ending 31st March 2008.}}
|-
| {{|Taxis Act (Northern Ireland) 2008|ania|4|21-04-2008|maintained=y|archived=n|An Act to make provision regulating taxi operators, taxis and taxi drivers; and for related purposes.}}
|-
| {{|Public Health (Amendment) Act (Northern Ireland) 2008|ania|5|06-05-2008|maintained=y|archived=n|An Act to amend section 2A of the Public Health Act (Northern Ireland) 1967.}}
|-
| {{|Commission for Victims and Survivors Act (Northern Ireland) 2008|ania|6|23-05-2008|maintained=y|archived=n|An Act to replace the Commissioner for Victims and Survivors for Northern Ireland established by the Victims and Survivors (Northern Ireland) Order 2006 with a Commission for Victims and Survivors for Northern Ireland.}}
|-
| {{|Local Government (Boundaries) Act (Northern Ireland) 2008|ania|7|23-05-2008|maintained=y|archived=n|An Act to provide for 11 local government districts in Northern Ireland, for the division of those districts into wards, for the appointment of a Local Government Boundaries Commissioner to recommend the boundaries and names of those districts and wards and the number of wards in each district; and for connected purposes.}}
|-
| {{|Libraries Act (Northern Ireland) 2008|ania|8|17-06-2008|maintained=y|archived=n|An Act to provide for the establishment and functions of the Northern Ireland Library Authority; to enable the Department of Culture, Arts and Leisure to make grants in connection with the provision of library services; and for connected purposes.}}
|-
| {{|Mesothelioma, etc., Act (Northern Ireland) 2008|ania|9|02-07-2008|maintained=y|archived=n|An Act to make provision about lump sum payments to or in respect of persons with diffuse mesothelioma; and for connected purposes.}}
|-
| {{|Child Maintenance Act (Northern Ireland) 2008|ania|10|02-07-2008|maintained=y|archived=n|An Act to amend the law relating to child support; and for connected purposes.}}
|-
| {{|Budget (No. 2) Act (Northern Ireland) 2008|ania|11|02-07-2008|maintained=y|archived=n|An Act to authorise the issue out of the Consolidated Fund of certain sums for the service of the year ending 31st March 2009; to appropriate those sums for specified purposes; to authorise the Department of Finance and Personnel to borrow on the credit of the appropriated sums; to authorise the use for the public service of certain resources (including accruing resources) for the year ending 31st March 2009; to authorise the issue out of the Consolidated Fund of an excess cash sum for the service of the year ending 31st March 2007; and to repeal certain spent provisions.}}
|-
| {{|Charities Act (Northern Ireland) 2008|ania|12|09-09-2008|maintained=y|archived=n|An Act to provide for the establishment and functions of the Charity Commission for Northern Ireland and the Charity Tribunal for Northern Ireland; to make provision about the law of charities, including provision about charitable incorporated organisations; to make further provision about public charitable collections and other fund-raising carried on in connection with charities and other institutions; and for connected purposes.}}
|-
| {{|Pensions (No. 2) Act (Northern Ireland) 2008|ania|13|15-12-2008|maintained=y|archived=n|An Act to make provision relating to pensions; and for connected purposes.}}
}}

References

2008